APV may refer to:

 Actuarial present value, a probability weighted present value often used in insurance
 Adjusted present value, a variation of the net present value (NPV)
 Advanced Power Virtualization (renamed PowerVM), a software virtualization technique used by IBM
Alavuden Peli-Veikot, a multi-sport club in Alavus, Finland
 Allen Parkway Village, a housing development in Fourth Ward, Houston
 Apple Valley Airport (California), from its IATA airport code
 Approach Procedure with Vertical guidance, a type of Instrument approach in aviation
 APV (NMDAR antagonist), or AP5, a selective NMDA receptor antagonist
 APV plc, a former company making process equipment
 Asia Pacific Vision, a television content provider
Chevrolet Lumina APV, a minivan manufactured and marketed by General Motors
 Suzuki APV, a microvan manufactured and marketed by Suzuki
 Amazon Prime Video